Olearia heterocarpa, commonly known as Nightcap daisy bush, is a species of flowering plant in the family Asteraceae and is endemic to eastern Australia. It is a shrub with narrowly elliptic or lance-shaped leaves with toothed edges, and white and yellow, daisy-like inflorescences.

Description
The upper surface of the leaves is glabrous, the lower surface covered with grey or yellowish, star-shaped hairs. Each head has four to seven white ray florets surrounding three to five yellow disc florets. Flowering occurs from May to September and the fruit is an achene, the pappus with 17 to 21 bristles.

Taxonomy
Olearia heterocarpa was first formally described in 1963 by Stanley Thatcher Blake in Proceedings of the Royal Society of Queensland from specimens he collected in Lamington National Park. The specific epithet (heterocarpa) means "different-fruited".

Distribution and habitat
Olearia heterocarpa grows in forest and woodland from south-eastern Queensland to the Whian Whian area far north-eastern in New South Wales.

Conservation status
This olearia is listed as "near threatened" under the Queensland Government Nature Conservation Act 1992.

References

heterocarpa
Asterales of Australia
Flora of New South Wales
Flora of Queensland
Taxa named by Stanley Thatcher Blake
Plants described in 1963